Méchant, also known as MECHANT or Mechant, is a Los Angeles-based alternative rock/power pop band fronted by lead singer Regina Zernay. Former bassist for rock bands Halfcocked and Jam Balaya, Zernay formed the band in late 2002/early 2003 to showcase her own material.

Zernay is the primary songwriter and original bassist for the band. Original band members also include Jon Hayes (producer/lead guitarist), Mike Earnhart (drums), and Jim Jet (2nd guitar).  The band recorded their first demo in 2003, featuring the songs Sweet and Superhero in Training.  Sweet was included in the short film Outta Moves in 2005.

The original band dissolved in the summer of 2003. In 2005, with the help of several musician friends, Zernay began recording Méchant's second CD, Fate and the Arsenal. Most of the new record was written, recorded and produced by Zernay using her home studio. Fate and the Arsenal is scheduled for release in late 2006. The band has also reformed, with new members Mark Burgess (lead guitar), Robert Hirsh (drums), and Dan Frohnen (bass).

In May 2007, Zernay replaced bassist Sonia Tetlow in Cowboy Mouth. In May 2010, Zernay joined Cee Lo Green and the all-female backing band named Scarlet Fever, officially leaving Cowboy Mouth the following September.

External links
 http://www.myspace.com/mechant
 https://web.archive.org/web/20140110024107/http://mechantmusic.com/

American power pop groups
Musical groups established in 2002
Musical groups from Los Angeles
Pop punk groups from California
2002 establishments in California